Schrebera alata is a plant in the family Oleaceae. It grows as a tree up to 15 m (50 ft) tall. The specific epithet alata is from the Latin meaning "winged", referring to the petioles. Its habitat is forests and woodland from  altitude. Schrebera alata is native Ethiopia, the Democratic Republic of the Congo, Uganda, Rwanda, Burundi, Kenya, Tanzania, Angola, Zambia, Zimbabwe, Malawi, Mozambique, Eswatini and South Africa.

References

alata
Flora of Africa
Plants described in 1841